The 2014 European Junior Curling Challenge was held from January 3 to 8 at the Kisakallio Sports Institute in Lohja, Finland. Nations in the Europe zone that have not already qualified for the World Junior Curling Championships participated in the curling challenge. The top finishers of each tournament will advance to the 2014 World Junior Curling Championships in Flims, Switzerland.

Men

Teams

Round-robin standings
Final round-robin standings

Round-robin results
All draw times are listed in Eastern European Time (UTC+2).

Group A

Draw 1
Friday, January 3, 18:30

Draw 3
Saturday, January 4, 12:30

Draw 5
Saturday, January 4, 19:30

Draw 7
Sunday, January 5, 12:45

Draw 8
Sunday, January 5, 16:00

Draw 10
Monday, January 6, 9:00

Draw 12
Monday, January 6, 16:00

Draw 14
Tuesday, January 7, 9:00

Draw 15
Tuesday, January 7, 12:30

Group B

Draw 2
Saturday, January 4, 9:00

Draw 4
Saturday, January 4, 16:00

Draw 6
Sunday, January 5, 9:00

Draw 9
Sunday, January 5, 19:30

Draw 11
Monday, January 6, 12:30

Draw 13
Monday, January 6, 19:30

Draw 15
Tuesday, January 7, 12:30

Playoffs

Quarterfinals
Tuesday, January 7, 19:30

Semifinals
Wednesday, January 8, 10:00

Bronze Medal Game
Wednesday, January 8, 14:30

Gold Medal Game
Wednesday, January 8, 14:30

Women

Teams

Round-robin standings
Final round-robin standings

Round-robin results
All draw times are listed in Eastern European Time (UTC+2).

Group A

Draw 1
Friday, January 3, 18:30

Draw 2
Saturday, January 4, 9:00

Draw 4
Saturday, January 4, 16:00

Draw 5
Saturday, January 4, 19:30

Draw 7
Sunday, January 5, 12:45’’

Draw 9Sunday, January 5, 19:30Draw 10Monday, January 6, 9:00Draw 12Monday, January 6, 16:00Draw 14Tuesday, January 7, 9:00Group B
Draw 1Friday, January 3, 18:30Draw 2Saturday, January 4, 9:00Draw 3Saturday, January 4, 12:30Win by forfeit

Draw 5Saturday, January 4, 19:30Draw 6Sunday, January 5, 9:00Draw 8Sunday, January 5, 16:00Draw 10Monday, January 6, 9:00Draw 11Monday, January 6, 12:30Draw 13Monday, January 6, 19:30Draw 14Tuesday, January 7, 9:00Playoffs

QuarterfinalsTuesday, January 7, 16:00SemifinalsWednesday, January 8, 10:00Bronze Medal GameWednesday, January 8, 14:30Gold Medal GameWednesday, January 8, 14:30''

References

External links
European Junior Curling Challenge 2014

 
2014 in curling
Lohja
2014 in Finnish sport
International curling competitions hosted by Finland
2014